Conogethes semifascialis is a moth in the family Crambidae. It was described by Francis Walker in 1866. It is found in India and Australia, where it has been recorded from New South Wales and Queensland.

References

Moths described in 1866
Spilomelinae